is a Japanese athlete specialising in the sprint hurdles. She twice represented her country at the World Championships, first at the 2009 edition in Berlin and then over a decade later at the 2019 edition in Doha.

Her personal best in the event is 12.97 seconds (+1.2 m/s) set in Fujiyoshida in 2019. This is the current national record.

She retired in 2013 because of injuries. After marriage and childbirth, she decided to return to sport in 2017, first giving rugby a try and a year later coming back to athletics.

International competitions

1Representing Asia-Pacific

References

External links
Official site

1990 births
Living people
Sportspeople from Sapporo
Japanese female hurdlers
Asian Games competitors for Japan
Athletes (track and field) at the 2010 Asian Games
World Athletics Championships athletes for Japan
Athletes (track and field) at the 2020 Summer Olympics
Olympic athletes of Japan
21st-century Japanese women